Ronen Harazi (born 30 March 1970) is a former Israeli footballer.

Beitar
During his time at Beitar, Harazi attracted interest from English side Sunderland. The club was ready to place a £400,000 bid for Harazi, but the player failed a medical examination, due to a metal rod inserted in his leg. Harazi took the matter to FIFA, demanding a £600,000 payout from Sunderland.

Loan to Haifa
After establishing himself on a wider stage, he was brought to Haifa on loan to provide cover for Alon Mizrahi's departure to French club, Nice. Harazi had trouble acclimating to Haifa and fighting for a first team spot against new signing Viktor Paço.

International goals

Honours
Beitar Jerusalem:
Israeli Premier League (2):1992–93, 1996–97
Hapoel Tel Aviv:
Israeli Premier League (1)1999-00
State Cup (1):1999-00

Notes

External links
  Profile and biography of Ronen Harazi on Maccabi Haifa's official website
  Profile and statistics of Ronen Harazi on One.co.il

1970 births
Living people
Israeli Jews
Israeli footballers
Hapoel Ramat Gan F.C. players
Beitar Jerusalem F.C. players
UD Salamanca players
Hapoel Haifa F.C. players
Bursaspor footballers
Maccabi Haifa F.C. players
Hapoel Tel Aviv F.C. players
La Liga players
Süper Lig players
Liga Leumit players
Israeli Premier League players
Israel international footballers
Israeli expatriate footballers
Expatriate footballers in Spain
Expatriate footballers in Turkey
Israeli expatriate sportspeople in Spain
Israeli expatriate sportspeople in Turkey
Footballers from Ramat Gan
Israeli people of Yemeni-Jewish descent
Association football forwards
Israeli Footballer of the Year recipients